The defense of Brest Fortress was the first major battle of Operation Barbarossa, the Axis invasion of the Soviet Union launched on 22 June 1941. The German Army attacked without warning, expecting to take Brest on the first day, using only infantry and artillery, but it took them a week, and only after two bombardments by the Luftwaffe. Many defenders were killed or captured.

Background

The area around the nineteenth-century Brest Fortress was the site of the 1939 Battle of Brześć Litewski, when the German XIX Panzer Corps captured it from the Polish Army during the Polish September Campaign. According to the terms of the 1939 German-Soviet Nonaggression Pact, the territory around Brest as well as 52 percent of Poland was assigned to the Soviet Union.

In the summer of 1941, the Germans advanced to capture the fortress from the Red Army. The Germans planned to seize Brest and the Brest Fortress, which was in the path of Army Group Centre, during the first day of Operation Barbarossa. The fortress and the city controlled the crossings over the Bug River, as well as the Warsaw–Moscow railway and highway.

Opposing forces
The Brest garrison consisted of approximately 9,000 Soviet soldiers, including regular soldiers, tankmen, border guards and NKVD operatives. The Red Army soldiers belonged to elements of the 6th and 42nd Rifle Divisions, under Colonel Mikhail Popsuy-Shapko and Major-general Ivan Lazarenko respectively, the 17th Frontier Guards Detachment of the NKVD Border Troops and various smaller units (including the hospital garrison and a medical unit, as well as units of the 132nd Separate NKVD Convoy Battalion, etc.) inside the fortress. There were also 300 families of the servicemen inside the fortress as well.

The Austrian 45th Infantry Division (about 17,000 strong) had the task to take the fortress during the first day. For the first five minutes of the shelling it was supported by parts of the artillery of the 31st and 34th Infantry Divisions. The 45th Division had neither aircraft nor tanks at its disposal but was supported on 22 June by a battery of assault guns from 34th Division and on June 29, by some Ju 88 bombers that dropped 23 bombs.

Siege

The fortress had no warning when the Axis invasion began on 22 June 1941, and it became the site of the first major fight between Soviet forces and the Wehrmacht. Many of the Soviet survivors of the fighting wrote after the war that the fortress was bombed by German aircraft. Due to the simultaneous artillery fire, tank support against the fortress made this not possible. The initial artillery fire took the fortress by surprise, inflicting heavy material and personnel casualties. The first German assault groups crossed the Bug river four minutes after the bombardment had started; the surprised Soviet defenders were unable to form a solid front and instead defended isolated strongpoints–the most important of which was the fortress.

Some Soviet troops managed to escape the fortress but most were trapped inside by the encircling German forces. Despite having the advantage of surprise, the attempt by the Germans to take the fortress with infantry quickly stalled with high losses: about 281 Wehrmacht soldiers died the first day in the fighting for the fortress. Fighting continued two more days. By the evening of June 24, 1941, some 368 Germans had been killed and 4,000–5,000 Red Army soldiers had been captured . On June 25 and June 26, 1941, local fighting continued mainly in the citadel. In the evening of June 26, 1941, most of the northern Kobrin fortification, except the East Fort, was captured.

Of the fighting around East Fort, the commander of the 45th Infantry Division, Generalmajor Fritz Schlieper, wrote to Oberkommando der Wehrmacht (OKW, German armed forces high command)

Although the Soviet soldiers in the opening hours of the battle were stunned by the surprise attack, outnumbered, short of supplies and cut off from the outside world, many of them held out much longer than the Germans expected. The Germans used artillery, rocket mortars 15 cm Nebelwerfer 41 and flame throwers. The civilians inside the fortress tended the wounded, reloaded the machine-gun drums and belts and took up rifles to help defend the fortress. Children brought ammunition and food supplies from half-destroyed supply depots, scavenged weapons and watched enemy movements.

Schlieper wrote in his detailed report that,

 
Chaplain Rudolf Gschöpf wrote,

On 24 June, with Germans having taken most parts of the fortress, some Soviet troops were able to link up and coordinate their actions under the command of Captain Ivan Zubachyov; his second in command was Regimental Commissar Yefim Fomin. On 26 June small Soviet forces tried to break out from the siege but failed and suffered many casualties; that day Zubachyov and Fomin were captured. Zubachyov was sent to a POW camp in Hammelburg where he died; Yefim Fomin was executed on spot under the Commissar Order and as a Jew.

As the East Fort could not be taken by infantry, the Luftwaffe bombed it twice on June 29 and forced its approximately 360 defenders to surrender.

Gschöpf wrote

The total German losses in the battle for the Brest fortress were about 429 killed and about 668 wounded. Soviet losses numbered about 6,800 POWs and about 2,000 dead. The magnitude of these losses can be weighed by the fact that total German losses on the Eastern Front up to 30 June 1941 amounted to 8,886 killed; the fighting at Brest accounted for over 5 per cent of all German fatalities.

After eight days of battle, the Germans had captured the fortress but the strategic objectives - control over the Panzerrollbahn I, the road to Moscow, the important railway line and the bridges over the Bug river - were accomplished the very first day of the war. Because of the high German losses the German High Command demanded General Fritz Schlieper to present a detailed report regarding combat at Brest 22–29 June 1941. It was made on July 8, 1941. A copy was captured by the Red Army near the town of Livny, Russia in winter 1941–1942.

Some individual soldiers and perhaps small groups of Red Army soldiers kept hiding in the fortress after the fall of the Eastern Fort. After the war graffiti were found on some fortress walls. They became iconic symbols of the defense. Two of them said

and

It is said that Major Pyotr Gavrilov, one of the best known defenders of Brest (later decorated for it as Hero of the Soviet Union) was captured only on 23 July.

Some authors claim that isolated defenders were being rooted out by Germans as late as August 8 when Hitler and Mussolini visited the fortress with heavy security to protect them from remaining defenders. The only documented proof of resistance after June 29, 1941 is a report that states that a shoot-out occurred on July 23, 1941, with the subsequent capture of a Soviet lieutenant ("Oberleutnant") the next day.

Aftermath

Since the mid-1950s, a myth grew that the fortress held out for 32 days and that the defenders refused to surrender. Brest Fortress became a symbol of Soviet resistance. In 1965, the fortress received the title of Hero Fortress for the 1941 defense. In 1971, a huge memorial was opened with the Museum of the Defense of the Brest Fortress as its centrepiece. Several monuments in the style of socialist realism dominate the area. The main monument, a -high concrete head, in 2014 was purportedly "awarded" the title of "the world's ugliest monument" by CNN, for which the CNN Moscow Chief of staff had to apologize, as this caused outrage.

The events surrounding the defense of Brest Fortress were dramatized in the 1957 film Immortal Garrison and again in the 2010 film Fortress of War. The Soviet writer Boris Vasilyev wrote a novel named His Name Is Not in the List (В списках не значился) about a soldier named Nikolai Pluzhnikov who defended the Brest Fortress in 1941. At the end of the novel, when Pluzhnikov was captured by the German troops and was interrogated, he simply replied "I am a Russian soldier," and died due to exhaustion from months of fighting. Vasilyev's novel was dramatized in the 1995 film I, a Russian soldier (Я — русский солдат), directed by Andrey Malyukov.

Amongst the huge amount of Soviet literature there are no academic publications, since Soviet historians avoided the topic. The first Russian semi-academic monograph was published only in 2008 by Rostislav Aliev. The first and so far only PhD thesis on the Battle of Brest 1941 was defended in 2019 and published in 2021 by Christian Ganzer.

References

Further reading
 Aliev, Rostislav & Britton, Stuart, The Siege of Brest 1941: A Legend of Red Army Resistance on the Eastern Front, Pen & Sword, October 2013.
 Kristian Gantser [Christian Ganzer]: Stalina dlinnaya ten’. Plen kak klyuchevaya problema istoriografii oborony Brestskoy kreposti [Stalin's long shadow. Captivity as the central problem of a historiography of the defense of the Brest fortress]. In: Kristian Gantser [Christian Ganzer], Irina Yelenskaya, Yelena Pashkovich [et al.] (ed.): Brest. Leto 1941 g. Dokumenty, materiyaly, fotografii. Smolensk: Inbelkul’t, 2016, p. 22-41. 
 Kristian Gantser [Christian Ganzer], Irina Yelenskaya, Yelena Pashkovich [et al.] (ed.): Brest. Leto 1941 g. Dokumenty, materiyaly, fotografii. Smolensk: Inbelkul’t, 2016.   
 Ganzer, Christian: German and Soviet Losses as an Indicator of the Length and Intensity of the Battle for the Brest Fortress (1941). In: The Journal of Slavic Military Studies, Volume 27, Issue 3, p. 449-466.
 Christian Ganzer: Kampf um die Brester Festung 1941. Ereignis - Narrativ - Erinnerungsort, Paderborn 2021 (Krieg in der Geschichte 115).
 Ganzer, Christian; Paškovič, Alena: „Heldentum, Tragik, Kühnheit.“ Das Museum der Verteidigung der Brester Festung. In: Osteuropa 12/2010, pp. 81–96. 
 Ganzer, Christian: Remembering and Forgetting: Hero Veneration in the Brest Fortress. In: Siobhan Doucette, Andrej Dynko, Ales Pashkevich (ed.): Returning to Europe. Belarus. Past and Future. Warsaw 2011, p. 138-14. 
 Ganzer, Christian: Czy „legendarna twierdza“ jest legendą? Oborona twierdzy brzeskiej w 1941 r. w świetle niemeckich i austriackich dokumentów archiwalnych. In: Wspólne czy osobne? Miesca pamięci narodów Europy Wschodniej. Białystok/Kraków 2011, S. 37-47. 
 Kershaw, Robert, War Without Garlands: Operation Barbarossa 1941-1942, Ian Allan Publishing, 2010
 Moschansky, I. & V. Parshin, THE TRAGEDY OF BREST 1941, Military Chronicle 2007 Paperback (Russian text but English summary and captions)

External links
 Soviet Citadel of Brest-Litovsk is Captured Jun 1941, Combat footage. German Wartime Newsreel (Die Deutsche Wochenschau Nr.565)
  Подвиг героев бессмертен
  Брестская крепость (English version available)
  
 World War II aerial photo
 German Wehrmacht movie ending with Brest claimed to be in German hands

World War II sites in Belarus
World War II sites of the Soviet Union
Conflicts in 1941
History of Brest, Belarus
Brest
Sieges involving Germany
Battles and operations of the Soviet–German War
Belarus in World War II
June 1941 events
Attacks on military installations in the 1940s